The Udinotti Museum of Figurative Art is a non-profit 501(c)3 museum located in Paradise Valley, Arizona. The museum was founded by sculptor, painter, printmaker, poet, and gallery owner Agnese Udinotti in 2007. 'The primary goal of the museum is to educate the public about the historical evolution and importance of figurative art." The museum is not open to the public for tours.

Collection
The museum’s collection includes art by:

 Leonard Baskin  
 Rafael Coronel
 Stephen De Staebler
 Franz Duckers
 Konishi Hirosada
 Don Reitz
 Mauricio Toussaint
 Utagawa Toyokuni
 Agnese Udinotti

References

 http://www.udinottimuseumoffigurativeart.org/about.html

Art museums and galleries in Arizona
Contemporary art galleries in the United States
Art museums established in 2007
Tourist attractions in Phoenix, Arizona
Modern art museums in the United States
2007 establishments in Arizona